The Munro-Hawkins House is a historic house on Vermont Route 7A in southern Shaftsbury, Vermont.  Built in 1807, it is a well-preserved example of transitional Georgian-Federal period architecture, designed by local master builder Lavius Fillmore.  It was listed on the National Register of Historic Places in 1973.

Description and history
The Munro-Hawkins House is located in southern Shaftsbury, on the east side of Vermont 7A, north of its junction with Airport Road.  It is a two-story wood-frame structure, five bays wide, with a side gable roof, clapboard siding, and two interior brick chimneys.  A single-story gabled ell extends to the rear of the west-facing main block.  Fluted Ionic pilasters articulate the building corners and flank the central front bay, supporting an entablature and modillioned cornice.  The main entrance is flanked by slender Ionic columns, and is topped by a fanlight window that breaks a gabled pediment.  Above the entry is a Palladian window, its windows separated by pilasters, with a gabled pediment.  A small gable rises on the roof above.  The gable ends at the sides of the house are fully pedimented, and have half-round windows at their centers.  The interior, organized in a central hall plan, retains original marble fireplace surrounds and woodwork.

The house was built in 1807, and is attributed to Lavius Fillmore, a noted regional master builder.  It was built for Joseph Munro (or Monroe), a wealthy farmer, and served as a farmhouse for many years.  It represents a high-quality local example of transitional architecture between the Georgian and Federal styles.

See also

National Register of Historic Places listings in Bennington County, Vermont

References

Houses on the National Register of Historic Places in Vermont
Georgian Revival architecture in Vermont
Federal architecture in Vermont
Houses completed in 1807
Houses in Bennington County, Vermont
Buildings and structures in Shaftsbury, Vermont
National Register of Historic Places in Bennington County, Vermont